Great Times! is an album by American pianist, composer and bandleader Duke Ellington's featuring duet performances with his arranger and musical partner Billy Strayhorn originally recorded for the Mercer Records label in 1950, and later released on a 10" LP called Piano Duets. The sessions were re-released on Riverside as Great Times! in 1984 with tracks from an additional session with Oscar Pettiford.

Reception
The AllMusic review by Scott Yanow awarded the album 4 stars, calling it "quite fascinating...  most memorable. Intriguing music".

Track listing
:All compositions by Duke Ellington except as indicated
 "Cotton Tail" - 2:55
 "C Jam Blues" (Barney Bigard, Ellington) - 2:58
 "Flamingo" (Edmund Anderson, Ted Grouya) - 3:00
 "Bang-Up Blues" - 3:08
 "Tonk"	(Ellington, Strayhorn) - 2:59
 "Johnny Come Lately" (Strayhorn)	- 3:01
 "In a Blue Summer Garden" (Ellington, Strayhorn) - 4:06
 "Great Times" - 2:56
 "Perdido" (Juan Tizol) -2:57
 "Take the "A" Train" (Strayhorn) - 2:20
 "Oscalypso" (Oscar Pettiford) - 2:44
 "Blues for Blanton" - 2:36
Recorded in New York on September 13 (tracks 9-12), October 3 (tracks 5-8) & November (tracks 1-4), 1950

Personnel
Duke Ellington – piano
Billy Strayhorn - piano (tracks 1-8), celeste (tracks 10 & 11)
Oscar Pettiford - cello (tracks 9-12)
Wendell Marshall (tracks 1-4), Joe Schulman (tracks 5-8), Lloyd Trotman (tracks 9-12) - bass
Jo Jones  (tracks 9-12), Unknown (tracks 1-4) - drums

References

Riverside Records albums
Duke Ellington albums
1950 albums
Billy Strayhorn albums